The 16th constituency of Paris is a French legislative constituency in Paris.  From the 2012 election on, the constituency is in the North-East of the city, covering areas previously in Paris's 20th constituency. From the 1988 to 2007 elections, the 16th constituency was based in the North-West of Paris, in areas now mostly in the 4th constituency.

Historic representation

Election results

2022

 
 
 
 
 
 
|-
| colspan="8" bgcolor="#E9E9E9"|
|-
 
 
 
 

Sarah Legrain won in the first round.

2017

 
 
 
 
 
 
 
|-
| colspan="8" bgcolor="#E9E9E9"|
|-

2012

2007
Elections between 1988 and 2007 were based on the 1988 boundaries.

 
 
 
 
 
|-
| colspan="8" bgcolor="#E9E9E9"|
|-

2002

 
 
 
 
 
 
 
|-
| colspan="8" bgcolor="#E9E9E9"|
|-
 
 

 
 
 
 

* Withdrew before the 2nd round

1997

 
 
 
 
 
 
|-
| colspan="8" bgcolor="#E9E9E9"|
|-

References

16